1850 Kohoutek, provisional designation , is a stony Florian asteroid from the inner regions of the asteroid belt, approximately 6 kilometers in diameter. It was named after Czech astronomer Luboš Kohoutek.

Discovery 

Kohoutek was discovered during World War II on 23 March 1942, by German astronomer Karl Reinmuth at Heidelberg Observatory in southwest Germany, Ten days prior to its discovery, the body was observed at Turku Observatory, Finland. However, these observations are not considered for the asteroid's orbital computation and its observation arc begins with the discovery observation at Heidelberg.

Since the discovery was made in the second half of March, the letter "E" in the provisional designation is erroneous. It should have been "F", but the initially incorrect assignment has persisted.

Classification and orbit 

It is a member of the Flora family, one of the largest families of stony asteroids in the asteroid belt. It orbits the Sun in the inner main-belt at a distance of 2.0–2.5 AU once every 3 years and 5 months (1,233 days). Its orbit has an eccentricity of 0.13 and an inclination of 4° with respect to the ecliptic.

Physical parameters

Rotation period 

In December 2014, a rotational lightcurve of Kohoutek was obtained from photometric observations in the R-band at the Palomar Transient Factory in California. Lightcurve analysis gave a rotation period of 3.68 hours with a brightness variation of 0.31 magnitude.

Diameter and albedo 

According to the survey carried out by NASA's Wide-field Infrared Survey Explorer with its subsequent NEOWISE mission, Kohoutek measures 5.91 and 7.64 kilometers in diameter, and its surface has an albedo of 0.181 and 0.383, respectively. The Collaborative Asteroid Lightcurve Link assumes an albedo of 0.24 – derived from 8 Flora, a S-type asteroid and the family's largest member and namesake – and calculates a diameter of 6.05 kilometers with an absolute magnitude of 13.26.

Naming 

This minor planet was named in honor of the Czech astronomer, Luboš Kohoutek (born 1935), former staff member of the Hamburg-Bergedorf Observatory and prolific observer and discoverer of minor planets and comets, most notably 75D/Kohoutek, 76P/West–Kohoutek–Ikemura, and the long-period Comet Kohoutek. He has also contributed in the fields of planetary nebulae and emission-line stars. The official  was published by the Minor Planet Center on 20 February 1976.

References

External links 
 Asteroid Lightcurve Database (LCDB), query form (info )
 Dictionary of Minor Planet Names, Google books
 Asteroids and comets rotation curves, CdR – Observatoire de Genève, Raoul Behrend
 Discovery Circumstances: Numbered Minor Planets (1)-(5000) – Minor Planet Center
 
 

001850
Discoveries by Karl Wilhelm Reinmuth
Named minor planets
19420323